Hypsopygia audeoudi is a species of snout moth in the genus Hypsopygia. It was described by Joseph de Joannis in 1927 and is known from Mozambique.

References

Endemic fauna of Mozambique
Moths described in 1927
Pyralini